Ciega a citas is a Spanish television series produced by Mediaset España Comunicación and Big Bang Media, and aired by Cuatro TV channel. The series is starring Teresa Hurtado de Ory and Álex Gadea. It was released on March 10, 2014, and is inspired by the 2009 Argentine telenovela of the same name.

Cast  
Teresa Hurtado de Ory - Lucía González Soler 
Elena Irureta - Maruchi Soler 
Arancha Martí - Irene Zabaleta Soler 
Joaquín Climent - Zabaleta 
Miguel Diosdado - Rodrigo Carrión 
Belinda Washington - Pilar Aranda Serrano 
Luis Fernando Alvés - Ángel González
Octavi Pujades - Carlos Rangel 
Álex Gadea - Sergio Feo 
Marta Nieto - Natalia Valdecantos 
Ramón Pujol - Miguel Ayala 
Rubén Sanz - Raúl Estévez 
Rebeca Salas - Críspula "Kris" Soto 
Nico Romero - Simón Lozano 
Jorge Roelas - Adolfo Morcillo
 Adriana Torrebejano as Beatriz
 Pablo Puyol as Alberto

Awards 
2010 International Emmy Awards
 Best Telenovela (nominated)

References

External links 
 Official website

2014 telenovelas
Spanish telenovelas
2010s Spanish comedy television series
Telecinco telenovelas
Spanish-language telenovelas
2014 Spanish television series debuts
2014 Spanish television series endings